The Stanford Prison Experiment is a 2015 American docudrama thriller film directed by Kyle Patrick Alvarez, written by Tim Talbott, and starring Billy Crudup, Michael Angarano, Ezra Miller, Tye Sheridan, Keir Gilchrist, Olivia Thirlby, and Nelsan Ellis. The plot concerns the 1971 Stanford prison experiment, conducted at Stanford University under the supervision of psychology professor Philip Zimbardo, in which students played the role of either a prisoner or correctional officer.

The project was announced in 2002 and remained in development for twelve years, with filming beginning on August 19, 2014, in Los Angeles. The film was financed and produced by Sandbar Pictures and Abandon Pictures, and premiered at the 2015 Sundance Film Festival on January 26, before beginning a limited theatrical release on July 17, 2015. The film received mostly positive reviews from critics.

Plot
Stanford University psychology professor Philip Zimbardo conducts a psychological experiment to investigate the hypothesis that roles in social situations, rather than individual personality traits, cause participants' behavior. In the experiment, Zimbardo selects eighteen male students  to participate in a 14-day prison simulation to take roles as prisoners or guards. They receive $15 per day. The experiment is conducted in a mock prison located in the basement of Jordan Hall, the university's psychology department building. The students who are guards become abusive, as does Zimbardo himself, as they immerse themselves in their assigned roles. Two students who play the role of prisoners quit the experiment early due to psychological meltdowns. After being chastised and roughly brought back to reality by his girlfriend Christina Maslach, Zimbardo abruptly stops the entire experiment after only six days.

Cast

Production
A film about the Stanford prison experiment was first announced in 2002, when producer Brent Emery signed Tim Talbott to write the script for the film. Problems beset and delayed the project for twelve years, including financing and the 2007 writers' strike. In 2006, two competing films about the experiment were in development, one at Maverick Films and the other Inferno's The Experiment, which was a remake of the German film Das Experiment from 2001. Maverick Films, having an ownership break up in August 2008, continued on as Imprint Entertainment Imprint was expected to start filming in January 2009 under producer Christopher McQuarrie.

On August 19, 2014, Sandbar Pictures and Abandon Pictures came on board to finance the film. Kyle Patrick Alvarez was set to direct, and producers were Brent Emery, Lizzie Friedman, Greg Little, Lauren Bratman and Brian Geraghty.

Casting
On August 19, 2014, it was announced that Billy Crudup, Ezra Miller and Michael Angarano would play lead roles. On August 26, Jack Kilmer joined the cast to play Jim Randall, one of the student prisoners whose personality makes him a perfect subject to comply. On August 28, Nicholas Braun joined the film to play Karl Vandy, an abusive and sadistic guard. On September 4, Brett Davern was added to the cast, playing Hubbie Whitlow, an affable young participant whose failed escape attempt leads to grueling humiliation at the hands of sadistic guards. On September 9, Jesse Carere joined the cast to play Paul Beattie, Prisoner 5704, a gangly man who counts smoking as his only vice. On October 10, more of the ensemble cast was announced, including Olivia Thirlby as Dr. Christina Maslach, professor Zimbardo's future wife and fellow academic, Nelsan Ellis as Jesse Fletcher, Tye Sheridan as prisoner Peter Mitchell, James Frecheville as guard Matthew Townshend, Johnny Simmons as prisoner Jeff Jansen, and Ki Hong Lee as prisoner Gavin Lee.

Filming 
Principal photography began on August 19, 2014, in Los Angeles, and lasted 21 days.

Release
The film premiered at the Sundance Film Festival on January 26, 2015. By coincidence, Experimenter, a film about another notorious psychological experiment, the Milgram experiment, had premiered at Sundance the day before.

IFC Films acquired the US rights to the film on March 5, 2015. The film was theatrically released on July 17, 2015, by IFC Films, and on Blu-Ray and iTunes on November 17, 2015.

Reception

Upon its premiere at the 2015 Sundance Film Festival, The Stanford Prison Experiment received a positive response from critics. Review aggregator Rotten Tomatoes indicates an 84% approval rating, based on reviews from 98 critics, with an average score of 6.97/10. The site's consensus states: "As chillingly thought-provoking as it is absorbing and well-acted, The Stanford Prison Experiment offers historical drama that packs a timelessly relevant punch." On the review site Metacritic, the film has a score of 67 out of 100, based on 26 critics, indicating "generally favorable reviews".

Leslie Felperin of The Hollywood Reporter gave the film a positive review, writing: "For all its flaws it's a rich, thought-provoking film which, while challenging, is not without humor and visual pleasures." Kyle Smith of the New York Post felt that "Tim Talbott's dense script provides much to discuss and argue about, providing both left and right with talking points." Jordan Hoffman of The Guardian gave the film four out of five stars and judged that "Director Kyle Patrick Alvarez deserves all the praise in the world for the way he cranks up this pressure cooker script." Edward Douglas in his review for ComingSoon praised the film, remarking: "While this is going to be a polarizing and divisive film, it's one that people will talk about after seeing it, almost as if it was made as an experiment itself."

However, Justin Chang of Variety criticized the film, saying "The combination of relentless forward drive and gruesomely fastidious detail, while audacious and admirable in theory, begins to pay dwindling returns in a picture that feels rather longer than its 122-minute running time."

Accolades

References

External links

 
 
 

2015 psychological thriller films
2015 films
Alfred P. Sloan Prize winners
American psychological thriller films
American thriller films
Films about school violence
Films directed by Kyle Patrick Alvarez
Films set in 1971
Films set in California
Films set in Palo Alto, California
Films set in prison
Films set in the San Francisco Bay Area
Films set in universities and colleges
Films shot in Los Angeles
2010s prison films
Sundance Film Festival award winners
2015 independent films
Thriller films based on actual events
2010s high school films
Films scored by Andrew Hewitt
2010s English-language films
2010s American films